Weilbach may refer to:

 Weilbach, Austria, a municipality in Upper Austria
 Weilbach, Germany, a municipality in Bavaria
 Weilbach (Main), a river of Hesse, Germany
 Weilbachs Kunstnerleksikon, a Danish biographical dictionary of artists and architect
 Iver C. Weilbach & Co. A/S, a Danish provider of nautical charts and publications for the shipping industry
 Weilbach or Bad Weilbach, districts of the town Flörsheim am Main, Hesse, Germany
 Philip Weilbach (1834–1900), Danish art historian and encyclopedian, worked on Weilbachs Kunstnerleksikon